Eli Porter Ashmun (June 24, 1770May 10, 1819) was a Federalist United States Senator from Massachusetts from 1816 to 1818.

Early years
Eli Porter Ashmun was the eldest child of Justus and Kezia Ashmun.  He was born in the vicinity of Fort Edward, New York, from whence the family fled in 1777 during the advance of British troops of John Burgoyne in the Saratoga campaign of the American Revolutionary War.  They settled in Blandford, Massachusetts, where Ashmun's father operated the tavern.  Ashmun's education was quite rudimentary, but he was taken under wing by Theodore Sedgwick, who gave him legal training.  He was eventually admitted to the bar, and opened the first legal practice in Blandford.  He married Lucy Hooker, daughter of John Hooker of Northampton, with whom he had five children. 

In 1807, Ashmun was awarded an honorary degree by Middlebury College, and moved to Northampton where he continued his law practice.

Political career
In 1807, Ashmun won election to the Massachusetts Senate, serving from 1808 to 1810. In 1816, he served with the Massachusetts Governor's Council. Following the resignation of United States Senator Christopher Gore, he was elected by the state legislature to replace him, serving from June 12, 1816, to May 10, 1818.  He died in 1819, possibly of heart disease, and is interred in Northampton's Bridge Street Cemetery.

Ashmun was the father of George Ashmun (1804–1870), who served in the U.S. House of Representatives, and of John Hooker Ashmun.  The latter served as a partner in his father's law practice, and operated the Northampton Law School for several years.  He then became a prominent legal instructor at Harvard Law School.

References 
 
 
 Political Graveyard
 Northampton Cemetery Inscriptions

Notes
 

1770 births
1819 deaths
People from Washington County, New York
People of the Province of New York
American people of English descent
Federalist Party United States senators from Massachusetts
Members of the Massachusetts House of Representatives
Massachusetts Federalists
Massachusetts state senators
People from Blandford, Massachusetts
Middlebury College alumni